Karamea is a town on the West Coast of the South Island of New Zealand. Apart from a narrow coastal strip, the town of Karamea and its local area are completely surrounded to the south, east and north by Kahurangi National Park.

The town is located on the coastal plain adjacent to the Karamea River and the Ōtūmahana Estuary.

Karamea is a gateway to the Kahurangi National Park, and a base for visitors coming to see popular local attractions such as the Ōpārara Basin, Ōpārara Arches, the Fenian Track and caves, the Big Rimu Walk and the coastal scenery north of Kōhaihai on the Heaphy Track.

Toponymy 
The name Karamea is Māori – despite local jokes suggesting it was named by an Italian for his love – and is thought to either mean "red ochre" or be a corruption of Kakara taramea, "the smell of speargrass leaves." The name is used for the township and also for the surrounding area.

History
Large shell middens have been found in the area. Radiocarbon dating indicates that these middens are associated with occupation in the period AD 1400 to AD 1600. The evidence suggests that the site was used by Māori as a temporary stopping place on the route down the coast to collect pounamu.

The mouth of the Heaphy River is the site of an early Māori encampment dating back to perhaps 1380 AD, and there is evidence it was one of the few sites in the northwest South Island occupied by people for extended periods of time. There is significant evidence of stoneworking, including local pounamu as well as argillite, obsidian, and chert imported from elsewhere in Aotearoa. The significance of the site to Ngāi Tahu led to it being excluded from Kahurangi National Park.

The first Europeans and Chinese would have been early gold-miners in the 1860s.

Special Settlement Area 
In the early 1870s, the Nelson Provincial Government investigated the use of Special Settlement Areas as a way of developing remote parts of the province, and attracting immigrants. The conditions to be offered to immigrants included the offer of land on deferred payment terms, and the opportunity of partial employment by the Provincial Government for the first year after the immigrants arrived. The allotments of land would be between forty and two hundred acres to each head of family, and be open to those already in the Colony, as well as new immigrants. The Nelson Special Settlements Act was passed on 25 October 1872, to allow the scheme to proceed, but there were disputes with central government about allowing the scheme to extend to those already resident.

Prior to 1874, the Nelson Province had not been significantly involved in the immigration schemes organised by the Colonial Government, but in October of that year, around 250 adults arrived in Nelson seeking work, and another shipload of immigrants was on the way. There was insufficient work available to employ all these immigrants, and the province turned again to Special Settlement Areas as a solution. Karamea was chosen as a site for a Special Settlement Area partly because the area was already known from a gold rush 7 years earlier, but also that it had a harbour, and there were steamers passing regularly along the coast. By November 1874, a block of land of  had been reserved on the south side of the Karamea River, and in April 1875 a further  was reserved on the north side of the Karamea River . The planning of the settlement was placed under the control of Eugene O'Conor, Provincial Secretary, and member of the New Zealand House of Representatives.

The settlers at Karamea were mostly immigrants from four ships that arrived at Nelson between August 1874 and February 1875. The first settlers to arrive in Karamea were landed from the steamer Charles Edward, on 27 November 1874. Most of the 20 men who were landed had no experience of breaking in new land. They were initially allocated small sections of pakihi – flat boggy land with infertile, waterlogged soil high up on a terrace to the south of the Karamea River. Better land was found on the Karamea River flats below the terrace, but there were delays before this land was allocated. Women and children arrived in January 1875.

In October 1875, using labour from the settlers, work began on creating an inland track over the hills between Little Wanganui and Mohikinui to bypass the difficult and dangerous coastal track. The road to Karamea over the hilly section (known as the Karamea bluffs) north of Mokihinui, was not opened until 1916.

Murchison earthquake 
The Murchison earthquake on 17 June 1929 caused severe damage in the Karamea area, with all roads in the district closed and nearly all bridges damaged. Houses were badly damaged, with no chimneys left standing, and some houses burnt down. The wharf and wharf sheds were also badly damaged. The road from Westport to Karamea was severely damaged by large landslides, and telephone lines were broken completely isolating the town. A party travelled on foot from Karamea to Westport to report the damage. The earthquake disrupted efforts underway at the time to control an outbreak of diphtheria in the settlement, and it was necessary for serum to be delivered by air. The earthquake caused the silting up of the harbour and cut the community's road link for about two years. The reconstruction of the road over the hilly section between Mokihinui and Little Wanganui required a workforce up to 400 men at times. Small coastal vessels were used to transport people and supplies between Westport and the Karamea harbour while the road was rebuilt.

Dairy farming 

Dairy farming in the area began with the opening of the first Karamea Co-operative Dairy Company in 1893. This company struggled with payouts to farmers less than expectations and the venture was wound up in March 1897. There was no further progress until 1906, when J Curtin & Co opened a butter factory near the site of the 1893 plant. A newly formed Karamea Co-operative Dairy Company was established in 1911, to purchase the Curtin's factory. The new company received its first cream for processing on 20 September 1911. Approximately 40 tonnes was produced in the first year. There was no road out of Karamea at the time, so all the production had to be shipped on vessels that were capable of crossing the Karamea bar.

In 1935, the Karamea dairy factory was manufacturing 300 tonnes of butter annually. The industry slowly expanded, and milk powder was manufactured locally from the 1970s. Local processing eventually ceased, and milk is now transported by road tanker to Hokitika.

Geography

Setting 
Apart from a narrow coastal strip, the town of Karamea and its local area are completely surrounded to the south, east and north by Kahurangi National Park.

There are two main areas of residential accommodation and businesses on the north side of the Karamea River. These are Market Cross and the settlement of Karamea itself.

It has a surfing beach and a river popular for whitebaiting and fishing.

Rivers and estuary 

There is a large estuary known as Ōtūmahana, at the mouth of the Karamea River. This estuary is also the mouth of Baker Creek and Granite Creek. This type of environment is vulnerable and is nationally uncommon. The estuary is an important feeding and breeding area for birds and fish.

The estuary is the third largest tidal estuary on the West Coast, after Ōkārito Lagoon and Saltwater Lagoon. It has been classified as a Significant Wetland by the West Coast Regional Council in its Regional Land and Water Plan. A small specially protected area of wetland known as Ōtūmahana Reserve was established at the south-east corner of the estuary in 1983.

A life-size bronze statue of the extinct Haast's eagle or hōkioi was erected in Karamea in 2020. The initiative was a joint undertaking of the Karamea Estuary Enhancement Project and local iwi Ngāti Waewae. The hōkioi represents the spiritual guardian of the estuary.  The statue is called Te Maia Kahurangi, and was unveiled on 22 February 2020. It depicts the ancestor Maia who rode an eagle he raised from a chick. It was cast in bronze by Gillie and Marc and is 300 cm high.

Flood risk
There is a history of flooding from the Karamea River. In 1899, a large flood swept away a new bridge across the river and caused damage to settlers homes, farms and crops. Another major flood caused serious damage in January 1915, inundating the main street and the majority of houses.

Deposits of silt raised the level of the river bed and led to a greatly increased risk of flooding in the townships of Karamea and Market Cross. On 30 December 1929 there was heavy damage in Karamea and Arapito from a sudden flood attributed to the breach of a dam created during the earthquake. In April 1931, floodwaters entered most of the homes around Market Cross, and some in the Karamea township. In August 1931, the settlers were given access to relief funding from the West Coast Earthquake Relief Fund for the damage caused by these floods.

Over the next few years, stop banks and training walls were constructed on the north side of the river to help mitigate the flood risk to the town. In May 1936 the Karamea School Committee notified the Education Board of their concerns about the damage caused by repeated flooding of the school. Relocation to a new site was proposed. In October 1936 there was a further major flood that entered 40 houses in Karamea and Market Cross. In September 1937, a large flood led to the river breaking through to the sea at the location of the old river mouth, cutting a new channel that greatly reduced the flood risk to the town and enabled the entry of vessels at high tide. Further river protection works were installed between 1938 and 1940, and these successfully defended the township during a heavy flood in the river in February 1940.

Between 2008 and 2010, the two openings merged at a location giving a direct exit to the sea for the Karamea River. From December 2010, the combined opening migrated south. Between 2013 and 2015, the channel moved further south by over  2 km. This southern location of the channel increases the risk of flooding in some areas of Karamea. A report to the West Coast Regional Council in 2016 recommended mechanical excavation of a breach channel to allow the next major flood to cut a new direct route to the sea, and mitigate the flood risk. Breach channels were constructed at the north end of the spit and a direct path was opened to the sea in 2017. The Regional Council cautioned that further interventions could be required in future to keep the outlet in a northern location.

Environmental protection 
In July 2020, the West Coast Regional council secured funding to support Clean Streams Karamea, a locally-based not-for-profit environmental protection group. The funding will enable the raising and planting of 315,000 trees along  of riparian margins of waterways through farms. The project is expected to take 3–5 years.

Climate

Demographics
The population of Karamea town was 357 in the 2018 census, a decrease of 21 from 2013. There were 195 males and 159 females. 92.4% of people identified as European/Pākehā, 6.7% as Māori and 3.4% as Pacific peoples. 12.9% were under 15 years old, 4.2% were 15–29, 53.8% were 30–64, and 27.7% were 65 or older.

The statistical area of Karamea, which at 3,128 square kilometres is much larger than the town, had a population of 714 at the 2018 New Zealand census, a decrease of 54 people (−7.0%) since the 2013 census, and a decrease of 84 people (−10.5%) since the 2006 census. There were 381 households. There were 393 males and 324 females, giving a sex ratio of 1.21 males per female. The median age was 53.3 years (compared with 37.4 years nationally), with 99 people (13.9%) aged under 15 years, 60 (8.4%) aged 15 to 29, 378 (52.9%) aged 30 to 64, and 177 (24.8%) aged 65 or older.

Ethnicities were 92.0% European/Pākehā, 10.5% Māori, 2.9% Pacific peoples, 0.8% Asian, and 3.4% other ethnicities (totals add to more than 100% since people could identify with multiple ethnicities).

The proportion of people born overseas was 16.4%, compared with 27.1% nationally.

Although some people objected to giving their religion, 65.1% had no religion, 21.8% were Christian and 2.1% had other religions.

Of those at least 15 years old, 54 (8.8%) people had a bachelor or higher degree, and 165 (26.8%) people had no formal qualifications. The median income was $19,900, compared with $31,800 nationally. The employment status of those at least 15 was that 219 (35.6%) people were employed full-time, 126 (20.5%) were part-time, and 27 (4.4%) were unemployed.

Economy 
In 2020, it was reported that Karamea had a GDP of $26.8m, with 199 jobs in 111 businesses. Dairy farming and tourism are the main economic drivers, and the service industry employs approximately a quarter of the workforce. Other former industries in the area include sphagnum moss, possum control, fishing, and fine furniture production. Horticultural tomato growers  and a plant nursery also provide income. Fruit grown in the area includes tamarillo, which can be grown here due to the area's mild and frost-free microclimate.

Transport 
As at 2018, the road to Karamea was funded by Waka Kotahi via a special purpose road funding category, but the agency signalled that this funding category could end by 2024.

Air transport is available from Karamea Aerodrome.  Golden Bay Air flies from Karamea to from Wellington, Takaka and Nelson. There is also a helicopter charter service at the aerodrome.

Attractions
Tourists visit Karamea all year round to enjoy the many scenic attractions in the region, including Kahurangi National Park. Tourism is a fast-growing segment of the local economy, and the region is often said to be "New Zealand's best-kept secret".

Popular attractions in the area include the Ōpārara Basin, (including the Ōpārara Basin Arches), Honeycomb Hill Cave, Fenian Track and caves, and the Big Rimu Walk.

Amenities 

Karamea township offers local services including a general store, supermarket, petrol pumps, information centre, cafe, hotel, camping ground, motels, backpackers, art & craft shop, and a community library, the Karamea War Memorial Library.

The Karamea Centennial Museum is a small museum opened in 1974. The museum collections include photographs and exhibits on the local industries of sawmilling, dairying, gold mining, flax milling and shipping.

Until 1908 there was no church in Karamea; services were conducted in private homes, and a minister would visit from Westport or Mokihinui, often having to take an arduous coastal route along beaches and rocks. After the death by drowning in August 1906 of the crew of the Rangi while taking soundings on the Karamea Bar, the Westport vicar Rev Dart held services. He suggested locals might like to acquire a memorial, such as an organ, but the people of Karamea organised the construction of a church, taking three months and costing £69. The Holy Trinity Church was dedicated on 24 June 1908, and has stayed an interdenonominational community church ever since.

Education
The school celebrated 125 years of settlement and schooling in 2000. A rebuild costing $11m was being planned in 2020.

Notable people 
Notable people from Karamea include:
 Atholl Anderson (1943–present), archaeologist, was assistant principal of Karamea Area School 1968–1970
 Sophia Anstice (1849–1926), dressmaker, draper and businesswoman, lived in Karamea 1874–1878 and started her dressmaking business there
 Anna Harrison (1983–present), netball player, raised in Karamea

References

Sources

External links

Information centre, Karamea
Karamea Community Website
Karamea Area School
Karamea (West Coast Notes) Article on the settlement of Karamea and its history, pub. in the Otago Witness, 18 August 1898.

 
Buller District
Populated places in the West Coast, New Zealand